The Bundarra and Tingha Advocate was an English language newspaper published in Bundarra, New South Wales.  It was published from 1900 to 1932.

History 
The Bundarra and Tingha Advocate was established on 1 December 1900.  It was also referred to as the Bundarra Advocate. Between 1900 and 1906 it was edited by Frank Walter Vincent Jnr.

Digitisation 
The various versions of the paper have been digitised as part of the Australian Newspapers Digitisation Program project hosted by the National Library of Australia.

See also 
 List of newspapers in Australia
 List of newspapers in New South Wales

References

External links
 

Defunct newspapers published in New South Wales
Tingha, New South Wales